Puthagam is a 2013 Indian Tamil-language film directed by television personality Vijay Adhiraj and produced by S. Manjula for Ram Pictures Private Limited.

The film stars Sathya, brother of actor Arya, in the lead role; Rakul Preet Singh, a former Miss India, as the leading lady; Telugu actor Jagapati Babu as the antagonist; and Sanjay Bharathi, son of veteran actor/director Santhana Bharathi (who also starred in the film), along with Vignesh Vijaykumar of Kadhalil Sodhappuvadhu Yeppadi fame in supporting roles alongside Aishwarya Rajesh, Suresh, and Rachana Maurya, among others.

The film was shot in Sony F 65. J. Laxman Kumar of Vennila Kabadi Kuzhu was the man behind the camera, and the music was scored by James Vasanthan. The movie also has GK as its art director and cinematography Laxman Kumar. The film was released on 14 January 2013.

Plot
Mohan (Sathya) lives in Chennai. His two roommates, Anthony (Vignesh Vijayakumar) and Radhakrishnan (Sanjay Bharathi) are from less fortunate backgrounds. Despite their differences, they are best friends. Radhakrishnan is in love with his boss Thara (Aishwarya Rajesh). One day, Mohan borrows a book from the Chennai Literary Society library for his television reporter girlfriend Divya (Rakul Preet Singh). He then finds a note in the book that leads him to a cemetery. All the graves painted blue have thousands of bank notes instead of dead bodies. Mohan shares this news with his roommates and they decide to share the cash to solve their families' financial problems.

At the same time, Divya is covering the high-profile case of a powerful but corrupt political leader Imaiyappan (Suresh). He has lost all the black money that he has been hiding away from the authorities for years by giving it to a close friend for safekeeping. Now, the friend has died and Imaiyappan does not know where all his black money is. He is forced to seek the help of JB (Jagapati Babu) and Dolly (Rachana Maurya), two highly skilled former intelligence officers.

After much difficulty, JB and Dolly manage to track down the family of Imaiyappan's late friend. The friend had hidden the location of the black money in a book in a Chennai library before he was run over by a truck. He had sent the book's registry number via a text message to his family so that they could take it and move to London. JB and Dolly then learn that the last person to check out the supposed book from the library was Mohan.

Mohan and everyone he loves then ends up in harm's way when both JB and Imaiyappan come after him. In the end, JB decides to let Mohan and his loved ones life when he discovers that Mohan only took a small portion of the black money to help his roommates with their finances, while he donated the rest of them to various charities across the city anonymously. Imaiyappan then has a heart attack when he learns that both his reputation and black money are gone forever.

In the end, Mohan is shown going on a vacation with Divya and their friends. Unknown to them, JB and Dolly are following them. It turns out that Mohan had only donated part of the money to charities, and he had transferred the rest to a Swiss bank and turned them all into legal money. JB is enraged as he has been tricked by a boy as young as Mohan and sets out to trap him.

Cast

Filming
Filming of the movie started in April, incidentally the first shot was directed by P. Vasu. The movie comprises five sound tracks out of which three were canned in Bangkok and Pattaya. The shooting of the movie was completed and Puthagam hit the theatres worldwide.

Soundtrack

The soundtrack is composed by James Vasanthan, who is Vijay's friend and also a television anchor earlier. Audio was rumoured to be launched on 27 Oct but got launched on 12 Nov 2012 at the Hotel Hyatt, Chennai.  Actors Jagapathi Babu, Arya, P. Vasu, Shanthanu Bhagyaraj, Parthiban, Suhasini, Rahika, Kuyil; music directors James Vasanthan and Vijay Antony; and lyricists Na. Muthukumar and Madhan Karky were among those at the event.

Unfortunately, the soundtrack was not promoted well in radio stations which led James to show his anger on social-blogging site: "Don't know why FM stations show discrimination towards composers. The recently-released Puthagam of mine is not even played once in few FMs".

 "Kondadathaan" - Tippu, Rahul, Sunandan
 "Mella Poopupukudhe" - Belly Raj, Deepa Miriam
 "Italica" - Mathangi
 "Say That You Love Me" - Suchitra, Prasad
 "Money Is So Funny" - Gerard Johnson, Maya

Critical reception
Behindwoods wrote:"Puthagam allows James Vasanthan to churn out some urban tunes for a youthful album and the result is a soundtrack that shines in parts". Milliblog wrote:"James’s music is erratic, as usual, but the highlights impress". Musicperk.com rated the album 7.5/10 quoting "This book has some interesting numbers too !".

Release
The distribution rights for Puthagam in Tamil Nadu were bought by Gemini Film Circuit, which had produced and distributed Nanban. The film was released on 14 January 2013 on the eve of Pongal festival. The film opened with 64 shows on its first weekend in Chennai box office. It was removed after one week. It sold 3,900 tickets in Chennai during its lifetime.

Critical reception
Indiaglitz wrote:"what could have been a racy and an innovative thriller was plagued by mediocre screenplay which drags the movie in and out. Puthagam the movie is a slow oozing out thriller". Times of India wrote:"'Puthagam' doesn't turn out to the fast-paced read it had the potential to be". Behindwoods wrote:"the result of what might have been an edge of the seat thriller turns into a long drama filled with the usual sentiments played by usual characters".

References

External links
 

2013 films
2010s Tamil-language films
2013 directorial debut films
Films scored by James Vasanthan